Dermatobranchus multidentatus is a species of sea slug, a nudibranch, a marine gastropod mollusc in the family Arminidae.

Distribution
This species was described from Japan.

References

Arminidae
Gastropods described in 1949